Maxim Andreyevich Shaburov (born 24 January 1996) is a Russian wheelchair fencer, who won gold in the épée team and silver in the épée A event at the 2020 Summer Paralympics.

Shaburov has cerebral palsy. He trained in table tennis for six years before changing to fencing at the age of 14.

References

1996 births
Living people
Russian male fencers
Wheelchair fencers at the 2020 Summer Paralympics
Medalists at the 2020 Summer Paralympics
Paralympic silver medalists for Russia
Paralympic medalists in wheelchair fencing
Paralympic wheelchair fencers of Russia
Paralympic gold medalists for the Russian Paralympic Committee athletes
Paralympic silver medalists for the Russian Paralympic Committee athletes
Sportspeople from Novosibirsk
21st-century Russian people